Vickery House may refer to:

in the United States (by state then city)
Fields Place-Vickery House, Dahlonega, Georgia, listed on the National Register of Historic Places (NRHP) in Lumpkin County
Gulley-Vickery-Blackwell House, Hartwell, Georgia, listed on the NRHP in Hart County, Georgia
Horton-Vickery House, Hartwell, Georgia, listed on the NRHP in Hart County, Georgia
Vickery House (Lavonia, Georgia), listed on the NRHP in Franklin County, Georgia
Capt. David Vickery House, Taunton, Massachusetts, listed on the NRHP in Bristol County, Massachusetts
Vickery-Baylies House, Taunton, Massachusetts, listed on the NRHP in Bristol County, Massachusetts
Richard Vickery House, Waxahachie, Texas, listed on the NRHP in Ellis County, Texas

See also
McMullan-Vickery Farm, Hartwell, Georgia, listed on the NRHP in Hart County, Georgia
Vickery Building, Augusta, Maine, listed on the NRHP in Kennebec County